Bullard is a small town in Smith and Cherokee counties in the east-central part of U.S. state of Texas. Its population was 2,463 at the 2010 census, up from 1,150 at the 2000 census; by 2020, its population was 3,318.

The Smith County portion of the town is part of the Tyler metropolitan statistical area, while the Cherokee County portion is part of the Jacksonville micropolitan statistical area.

Bullard was earlier known as "Etna" and "Hewsville". The town is named for John H. Bullard, a Confederate soldier, and Emma Eugenia (Erwin) Bullard. In 1881, John Bullard opened the Hewsville post office in his store. In 1883, the Etna post office, near Hewsville, was closed. Then, the Hewsville office was renamed "Bullard". Many rural residents in northern Cherokee County are served by the Bullard post office. The bypassing of the railroad brought about the demise of Etna and the rise of Bullard.

History
The Etna post office, just west of Bullard, was granted in 1867, although settlers had been in the vicinity since the early 1850s. John and Emma Bullard arrived about 1870. A new post office named Hewsville was opened in the Bullards' store in 1881. The Etna post office was closed in 1883 and the Hewsville post office was renamed as Bullard.

When the Kansas and Gulf Short Line Railroad extended its route from Tyler to Lufkin, it passed through Bullard and built a depot there. This attracted new residents and business. In 1890, the town had 200 residents and most essential businesses, plus a doctor and a telegraph office. The railroad was renamed several times - becoming the St. Louis, Arkansas and Texas Railway and then (1892) the Tyler and Southwestern Railway.

In 1903, the two public schools (segregated) had five teachers and 186 students between them. By 1914, the population had doubled to 400 and the railroad changed names once again - becoming the St. Louis Southwestern Railroad.

During the 1920s, a theater opened in town and a community band was formed. The town gained some notoriety for its unique holding tank - a  wooden tub with bars mounted on a wagon frame. When full, the contraption was driven to Tyler for emptying.

The population was 450 after World War II. The community did not organize to elect a city council until 1948.

By the mid-1960s, the population had declined to 300, but it rebounded by 1973, when it reached 573. The community is now concentrated around the crossroads. Most residents commute for work to nearby Tyler.

Geography
Bullard is located in southern Smith County, with a small portion extending south into Cherokee County. Four-lane U.S. Route 69 passes through the east side of town, leading north to Tyler and south to Jacksonville.

Demographics

As of the 2020 United States census, there were 3,318 people, 981 households, and 766 families residing in the town.

As of the census of 2000,  1,150 people, 429 households, and 326 families resided in the town. The population density was 811.8 people per square mile (312.7/km2). The 464 housing units  averaged 327.5 per square mile (126.2/km2). The racial makeup of the town was 95.65% White, 1.48% African American, 0.35% Native American, 0.52% Asian, 1.13% from other races, and 0.87% from two or more races. Hispanics or Latinos of any race were 1.30% of the population.

Of the 429 households, 45.2% had children under the age of 18 living with them, 59.2% were married couples living together, 14.2% had a female householder with no husband present, and 23.8% were not families; 22.4% of all households were made up of individuals, and 11.4% had someone living alone who was 65 years of age or older. The average household size was 2.68 and the average family size was 3.15.

In the town, the population was distributed as 30.7% under the age of 18, 7.6% from 18 to 24, 31.2% from 25 to 44, 21.0% from 45 to 64, and 9.5% who were 65 years of age or older. The median age was 33 years. For every 100 females, there were 84.3 males. For every 100 females age 18 and over, there were 80.3 males.

The median income for a household in the town was $39,167, and for a family was $47,647. Males had a median income of $33,542 versus $23,587 for females. The per capita income for the town was $16,439. About 5.7% of families and 7.5% of the population were below the poverty line, including 8.1% of those under age 18 and 18.3% of those age 65 or over.

Education

The town of Bullard is served by the Bullard Independent School District. The schools of BISD are Bullard Early Childhood, Primary, Bullard Elementary, Bullard Intermediate, Bullard Middle, and Bullard High School. The town of Bullard is also the home of Brook Hill School, a private, Christian school serving Pre-K–12th grade students.

External links
 City of Bullard official website
 Bullard Texas History

References

Towns in Smith County, Texas
Towns in Texas
Towns in Cherokee County, Texas